Hillsbus is an Australian bus company that operates services in the Hills District of Sydney. Founded in 2004 when National Express merged its Glenorie Bus Company and Westbus (Hills District operations only) subsidiaries, it is today part of ComfortDelGro Australia.

History

First use of the Hillsbus name
In 1996, Westbus established a separate Hillsbus brand to run express services from the Hills District to the Sydney CBD and North Sydney, initially via the Anzac Bridge and from 1997 via the M2 Hills Motorway. However, the Hillsbus brand seemed to have disappeared by the 2000s as these services were classified as Westbus rather than Hillsbus in early versions of the Westbus website. These Westbus services, however, were still referred to by Westbus as "Hills City Express".

Current entity
On 11 February 2002, Hillsbus was revived as a joint venture between Westbus and National Express' newly acquired Glenorie Bus Company, and introduced a new bus route 642 under the Hillsbus brand. This service linked Dural and the City via the M2 and was therefore known as a "M2 City" express service. On 8 July the same year, Hillsbus introduced three more M2 City routes 650, 652 and 654. According to the Hillsbus timetables, these Hillsbus services were operated by Glenorie, even though neither Westbus nor Glenorie buses were used.

In December 2004, all Westbus routes operating out of Northmead and Seven Hills depots, as well as the rest of Glenorie Bus Company, were rebranded Hillsbus. At the same time, Hillsbus took over the operation of Harris Park Transport routes 620 - 630, following the latter ceasing operation. The services were transferred from Hillsbus to Sydney Buses on 28 January 2005. On 25 September 2005, after the purchase of Hillsbus by ComfortDelgro Cabcharge, routes 620, 625, 626, 627 and 630 were transferred back to Hillsbus.

Despite the rebranding to Hillsbus, the new Hillsbus website was only launched in January 2006, about a year after the rebranding. The delay could be related to the debt of Westbus and was only resolved after the sale of Westbus and Hillsbus to CDC. After the launch of the new website, it still did not show any timetables of the former Glenorie-operated timetables until May/June 2006, and during this period, customers were asked to check the Glenorie website instead.

When the Parramatta - Rouse Hill section of the North-West T-way opened on 10 March 2007, routes 730 (renumbered T63) and 735 (renumbered 616, now 616X) were transferred from Busways to Hillsbus with route 718 transferred from Hillsbus to Busways.

On 30 June 2014, the Opal card was rolled out on all of Hillsbus' NightRide and Region 4 routes (including school services).

On 28 July 2019, after the Sydney Metro Northwest opened in May, bus routes in the Hills District were reorganised, with some services rerouted to stop at various Sydney Metro stations.

In November 2022, CDC was awarded the contract to retain Region 4. The Hillsbus brand will be replaced by the CDC NSW brand when the contract commences in April 2023.

Routes
Since 2005, Hillsbus' services have formed Sydney Bus Region 4. In August 2013, Hillsbus successfully tendered to operate the Region 4 services for another five years from August 2014.

Hillsbus operates the following services:
 535 from Parramatta to Carlingford (rail replacement bus service)
Bus routes 600 to 665 in Sydney's north-western suburbs, including
600 (formerly Metrobus M60) from Hornsby to Parramatta
610X (formerly Metrobus M61) from Castle Hill to Queen Victoria Building. 
66x series along the North West T-Way (formerly T6x series)
Express services along the M2 Hills Motorway and Lane Cove Tunnel to Macquarie Park, North Sydney and Queen Victoria Building
Bus routes 700 to 715 in Sydney's western suburbs (Wentworthville, Seven Hills, Blacktown)

Other railway replacement bus services

Hillsbus also operated other railway replacement bus services between 2018 and 2019. Hillbus operated Station Link services (SLx series) between September 2018 and May 2019, while the Epping to Chatswood rail link was closed for upgrading and conversion to Sydney Metro Northwest. It stopped at Epping, Chatswood, Macquarie Park, Eastwood, Macquarie University, Beecroft and St Leonards stations. It was jointly operated with Transdev NSW. The service ceased when the Metro opened in May 2019.

Thereafter, until November 2019, Hillsbus operated the North West Night Bus to supplement the Metro North West Line on Sunday to Wednesday nights. Like Station Link, it was jointly operated with Transdev NSW.

Fleet

Depots

As of July 2022, Hillsbus operates 601 buses across four depots:
 Foundry Road (F) in Seven Hills - Head Office of Hillsbus - 204 buses
 Dural (D) - 177 buses
 Northmead (N) - 188 buses
 Seven Hills (V) - another depot also in Seven Hills, smaller than Foundry Road depot - 32 buses

Hillsbus also operated 62 buses at the Camellia depot designated for Station Link between September 2018 and May 2019, but they have since been moved to other Hillsbus, Hunter Valley Buses and Blue Mountains Transit depots after the cessation of Station Link.

Livery
Prior to 2010, Hillsbus adopted Westbus' new plain yellow livery. With the introduction of Metrobus routes, the Metrobus livery was applied to new buses dedicated to Metrobus operations. In 2010, the Transport for NSW white and blue livery began to be applied on new buses and repainted buses. Fleet dedicated for Station Link also carried the Transport for NSW livery but with "Station Link" labels and a pink body front. Most of the Station Link fleet have had the labels and pink front removed after the cessation of Station Link.

References

External links

Hillsbus website
Bus Australia CDC Sydney gallery

Bus companies of New South Wales
ComfortDelGro companies
National Express companies
Transport companies established in 2004
2004 establishments in Australia
The Hills Shire